Esbjerg Municipality is a municipality (Danish, kommune) in Region of Southern Denmark on the west coast of the Jutland peninsula in southwest Denmark. Its mayor is Jesper Frost Rasmussen, from the Venstre (Center-Right Party) political party. By 1 January 2007, the old Esbjerg municipality was, as the result of Kommunalreformen ("The Municipal Reform" of 2007), merged with the former Bramming and Ribe and a small part of Helle municipalities to form the new Esbjerg municipality. This municipality has an area of 741 km² (286 sq. miles) and a total population of 115,459 (2022).

Overview
The main town and the site of its municipal council is the city of Esbjerg, the fifth largest city in Denmark.

Neighboring municipalities with land connection are Tønder to the south, Haderslev to the southeast, Vejen to the east, and Varde to the north. The neighboring municipality to the west is Fanø, an island municipality located in Fanø Bay (Fanø Bugt). Beyond the island of Fanø and Fanø Bay is the North Sea.

Locations

Infrastructure

Rail 
Esbjerg Municipality has 13 railway stations, which forms a dense network, compared to other municipalities in Denmark, despite its many rural towns.

Politics
Esbjerg's municipal council consists of 31 members, elected every four years. The municipal council has seven political committees.

Municipal council
Below are the municipal councils elected since the Municipal Reform of 2007.

Twin towns – sister cities

Esbjerg is twinned with:

 Ely, England, United Kingdom
 Eskilstuna, Sweden
 Fjarðabyggð, Iceland
 Güstrow, Germany
 Jyväskylä, Finland
 Krems an der Donau, Austria
 Qeqqata, Greenland
 Ratzeburg, Germany
 Stavanger, Norway
 Suzhou, China
 Szczecin, Poland
 Tórshavn, Faroe Islands

References

 Municipal statistics: NetBorger Kommunefakta, delivered from KMD aka Kommunedata (Municipal Data)
 Municipal mergers and neighbors: Eniro new municipalities map

External links

 Esbjerg's official information portal
 Esbjerg municipality's official website
 The new Esbjerg municipality's official website (Danish only)
 Esbjerg Tourism Bureau's website
 SDU Esbjerg
 AAU Esbjerg
 The Peace movement of Esbjerg

 
Esbjerg
Municipalities of the Region of Southern Denmark
Municipalities of Denmark
Populated places established in 2007